The 2020–21 season was FC Ararat Yerevan's 30th consecutive season in Armenian Premier League.

Season events
On 23 July, Vardan Bichakhchyan was appointed as Ararat Yerevan's manager.

On 25 July, Ararat Yerevan announced the signing of Artak Yedigaryan, and David Manoyan.

On 26 July, Ararat Yerevan announced the signing of Juan Bravo from Lori, and Karen Muradyan from Shirak.

On 27 July, Ararat Yerevan announced the double signing of Edgar Malakyan and Vsevolod Yermakov from Shirak.

On 28 July, Ararat Yerevan announced the signing of Hrayr Mkoyan from Shirak, and Christian Jiménez from Lori.

On 29 July, Ararat Yerevan announced the signing of Zhirayr Margaryan from Shirak, and Igor Stanojević from Mačva Šabac.

On 31 July, Ararat Yerevan announced the signing of Marko Prljević and Uroš Nenadović from Shirak.

On 15 August, 2 from Ararat and 6 players from Ararat-2 tested positive for COVID-19. Two days later, Ararat reported another 7 players had tested positive.

On 18 August, the FFA postponed the match between Shirak and Ararat Yerevan due to the COVID-19 outbreak within the Ararat squad.

On 25 August, summer signings from Shirak, Zhirayr Margaryan, Hrayr Mkoyan, Marko Prljević, Edgar Malakyan, David Manoyan, Karen Muradyan and Uroš Nenadović, were all loaned back to Shirak to help Shirak in their UEFA Europa League qualifying game on 27 August.

On 4 September, Ararat Yerevan announced the signing of Aghvan Papikyan from Alashkert.

On 5 September, Ararat Yerevan announced the signing of Spasoje Stefanović from Sinđelić Beograd.

On 10 September, Ararat Yerevan announced the signing of Solomon Udo and Mory Kone from Shirak.

On 18 September, the FFA postponed the match between Ararat Yerevan and Ararat-Armenia due to Ararat-Armenia being involved in a UEFA Europa League match on 24 September.

On 29 September, the season was suspended indefinitely due to the escalating 2020 Nagorno-Karabakh conflict. On 13 October, the FFA announced that the season would resume on 17 October.

On 22 October, Ararat's match against Alashkert was postponed due to 4 positive COVID-19 cases within the Alashkert team.

On 7 January, Ararat Yerevan announced the signing of Artur Danielyan from Ararat-Armenia on a free transfer, with Grigor Meliksetyan joining the following day after leaving of Gandzasar Kapan.

On 15 January, Ararat Yerevan announced that they had terminated their contract with Spasoje Stefanović by mutual consent, with Dimitrije Pobulić signing the following day from Grafičar Beograd.

On 4 February, Ararat Yerevan announced the signing of Maksym Zaderaka from Oleksandriya.

On 17 February, Vahe Muradyan and Robert Marutyan left Ararat Yerevan.

On 22 February, Solomon Udo left Ararat Yerevan to sign for Shakhter Karagandy.

On 16 March, Lori walked off at the start of their match against Ararat Yerevan in protest of their Matchday 1 fixture being awarded to Urartu after Lori where unable to field a team due to COVID-19. With the match later being awarded to Ararat Yerevan 3–0.

Squad

Left club during season

Transfers

In

Out

Loans out

Released

Friendlies

Competitions

Premier League

Results summary

Results by round

Results

Table

Armenian Cup

Final

Statistics

Appearances and goals

|-
|colspan="16"|Players who left Ararat Yerevan during the season:

|}

Goal scorers

Clean sheets

Disciplinary Record

References

FC Ararat Yerevan seasons
Ararat Yerevan